is a Japanese actor and TV narrator. He is best known for his role in Kamen Rider series Kamen Rider Den-O as the owner of the DenLiner. He has also appeared in multiple competitions of Sasuke as a competitor and during that time has become one of only two people to fall off the Rolling Log obstacle in the First Stage and take the log with them. Ishimaru is the narrator in the anime series Toriko. He also narrates TV Asahi's series See the World by Train, which has run since June 1987.

Selected filmography

Film

Television

References

External links 
 
  

1953 births
Living people
People from Ōita Prefecture
Sasuke (TV series) contestants
20th-century Japanese male actors
21st-century Japanese male actors